Im Jae-geun (born 17 July 1950) is a South Korean boxer. He competed in the men's light middleweight event at the 1972 Summer Olympics.

References

1950 births
Living people
South Korean male boxers
Olympic boxers of South Korea
Boxers at the 1972 Summer Olympics
Place of birth missing (living people)
Light-middleweight boxers